The 2022 Fordham Rams baseball team will represent Fordham University during the 2022 NCAA Division I baseball season. It will be the program's 163rd season of existence, and their 28th season playing in the Atlantic 10 Conference. General manager, Kevin Leighton will assumed managerial duties for the 12th season.

Background 

The 2021 season saw Fordham post a 24–19 (11–9 Atlantic 10) record. The Rams failed to qualify for the 2021 Atlantic 10 Conference baseball tournament.

Preseason

Coaches poll 
The Atlantic 10 baseball coaches' poll was released on February 15, 2022. Fordham was picked to finish sixth in the Atlantic 10.

Player movement

Departures

Signing Day Recruits
The following players signed National Letter of Intents to play for Fordham in 2022.

Personnel

Coaching staff

Game log 

Schedule Source:
*Rankings are based on the team's current ranking in the D1Baseball poll.

Rankings

References

External links 
 Fordham Baseball

Fordham
Fordham Rams baseball seasons
Fordham Rams baseball